Octomeria (from Greek "eight part", referring to its 8 pollinia) is a plant genus belonging to the family Orchidaceae. The genus comprises about 150 species native to the Neotropics, mostly in Brazil.

List of species
Accepted species:

Octomeria aetheoantha Barb.Rodr., Gen. Spec. Orchid. 2: 106 (1881). 
Octomeria albiflora Hoehne & Schltr., Arch. Bot. São Paulo 1: 230 (1926). 
Octomeria albopurpurea Barb.Rodr., Gen. Spec. Orchid. 2: 107 (1881). 
Octomeria alexandri Schltr., Anexos Mem. Inst. Butantan, Secç. Bot. 1(4): 53 (1922). 
Octomeria aloefolia Barb.Rodr., Gen. Spec. Orchid. 2: 113 (1881). 
Octomeria alpina Barb.Rodr., Gen. Spec. Orchid. 2: 102 (1881). 
Octomeria amazonica Pabst, Orquídea (Rio de Janeiro) 29: 8 (1967). 
Octomeria anceps Porto & Brade, Arq. Inst. Biol. Veg. 3: 134 (1937). 
Octomeria anomala Garay & Dunst., Venez. Orchids Ill. 6: 284 (1976). 
Octomeria arcuata Rolfe, Bull. Misc. Inform. Kew 1909: 61 (1909). 
Octomeria auriculata Luer & Dalström, Selbyana 23: 26 (2002). 
Octomeria bomboizae Luer, Selbyana 23: 29 (2002). 
Octomeria bradei Schltr., Anexos Mem. Inst. Butantan, Secç. Bot. 1(4): 52 (1922). 
Octomeria buchtienii Schltr., Repert. Spec. Nov. Regni Veg. 27: 57 (1929). 
Octomeria caetensis Pabst, Bradea 2: 316 (1979). 
Octomeria caldensis Hoehne, Arch. Inst. Biol. Defesa Agric. 2: 50 (1929). 
Octomeria callosa Luer, Phytologia 49: 197 (1981). 
Octomeria campos-portoi Schltr., Arch. Jard. Bot. Rio de Janeiro 3: 291 (1922). 
Octomeria cariocana Pabst, Arch. Jard. Bot. Rio de Janeiro 12: 134 (1953). 
Octomeria chamaeleptotes Rchb.f., Linnaea 22: 817 (1850). 
Octomeria chloidophylla (Rchb.f.) Garay, Bot. Mus. Leafl. 21: 253 (1967). 
Octomeria cochlearis Rchb.f., Gard. Chron., n.s., 15: 266 (1881). 
Octomeria colombiana Schltr., Repert. Spec. Nov. Regni Veg. Beih. 7: 121 (1920). 
Octomeria concolor Barb.Rodr., Gen. Spec. Orchid. 2: 100 (1881). 
Octomeria connellii Rolfe, Trans. Linn. Soc. London, Bot. 6: 60 (1901). 
Octomeria cordilabia C.Schweinf., Bot. Mus. Leafl. 19: 204 (1961). 
Octomeria costaricensis Schltr., Repert. Spec. Nov. Regni Veg. Beih. 19: 111 (1923). 
Octomeria crassifolia Lindl., Companion Bot. Mag. 2: 354 (1836). (formerly known as Octomeria densiflora)
Octomeria crassilabia Pabst, Rodriguésia 18-19: 31 (1956). 
Octomeria cucullata Porto & Brade, Arq. Inst. Biol. Veg. 3: 135 (1937). 
Octomeria dalstroemii Luer, Selbyana 22: 117 (2001). 
Octomeria decipiens Dammer, Orchis 4: 58 (1910). 
Octomeria decumbens Cogn. in C.F.P.von Martius & auct. suc. (eds.), Fl. Bras. 3(4): 642 (1896). 
Octomeria deltoglossa Garay, Bot. Mus. Leafl. 18: 199 (1958). 
Octomeria dentifera C.Schweinf., Bot. Mus. Leafl. 19: 205 (1961). 
Octomeria diaphana Lindl., Edwards's Bot. Reg. 25(Misc.): 91 (1839). 
Octomeria edmundoi Brade, Orquídea (Rio de Janeiro) 6: 14 (1943). 
Octomeria ementosa Barb.Rodr., Gen. Spec. Orchid. 2: 102 (1881). 
Octomeria erosilabia C.Schweinf., Bot. Mus. Leafl. 3: 85 (1935). 
Octomeria estrellensis Hoehne, Arq. Bot. Estado São Paulo, n.s., f.m., 1(1): 15 (1938). 
Octomeria exchlorophyllata Barb.Rodr., Gen. Spec. Orchid. 2: 103 (1881). 
Octomeria exigua C.Schweinf., Bot. Mus. Leafl. 3: 86 (1935). 
Octomeria fasciculata Barb.Rodr., Gen. Spec. Orchid. 1: 32 (1877). 
Octomeria fialhoensis Dutra ex Pabst, Sellowia 10: 133 (1959). 
Octomeria fibrifera Schltr., Repert. Spec. Nov. Regni Veg. Beih. 35: 63 (1925). 
Octomeria filifolia C.Schweinf., Bot. Mus. Leafl. 19: 206 (1961). 
Octomeria fimbriata Porto & Peixoto, Arch. Jard. Bot. Rio de Janeiro 3: 288 (1922). 
Octomeria flabellifera Pabst, Bradea 2: 56 (1975). 
Octomeria flaviflora C.Schweinf., Bot. Mus. Leafl. 19: 207 (1961). 
Octomeria frenchiana P.Feldmann & N.Barré, Lindleyana 11: 199 (1996). 
Octomeria gehrtii Hoehne & Schltr., Arch. Bot. São Paulo 1: 232 (1926). 
Octomeria gemmula Carnevali & I.Ramírez, Ernstia 39: 13 (1986). 
Octomeria geraensis (Barb.Rodr.) Barb.Rodr., Gen. Spec. Orchid. 2: 295 (1881). 
Octomeria glazioveana Regel, Trudy Imp. S.-Peterburgsk. Bot. Sada 8: 277 (1883). 
Octomeria gracilicaulis Schltr., Repert. Spec. Nov. Regni Veg. Beih. 35: 63 (1925). 
Octomeria gracilis Lodd. ex Lindl., Edwards's Bot. Reg. 24(Misc.): 36 (1838). 
Octomeria graminifolia (L.) R.Br. in W.T.Aiton, Hortus Kew. 5: 211 (1813). 
Octomeria grandiflora Lindl., Edwards's Bot. Reg. 28(Misc.): 64 (1842). 
Octomeria guentheriana Kraenzl., Repert. Spec. Nov. Regni Veg. 25: 19 (1928). 
Octomeria harantiana I.Bock, Orchidee (Hamburg) 35: 49 (1984). 
Octomeria hatschbachii Schltr., Repert. Spec. Nov. Regni Veg. 23: 45 (1926). 
Octomeria heleneana Carnevali & F.Delascio, Ernstia 45: 12 (1987). 
Octomeria helvola Barb.Rodr., Gen. Spec. Orchid. 2: 110 (1881). 
Octomeria hirtzii Luer, Selbyana 23: 29 (2002). 
Octomeria hoehnei Schltr., Arch. Bot. São Paulo 1: 234 (1926). 
Octomeria iguapensis Schltr., Anexos Mem. Inst. Butantan, Secç. Bot. 1(4): 50 (1922). 
Octomeria integrilabia C.Schweinf., Bot. Mus. Leafl. 3: 87 (1935). 
Octomeria irrorata Schltr., Notizbl. Bot. Gart. Berlin-Dahlem 7: 325 (1919). 
Octomeria itatiaiae Brade & Pabst, Orquídea (Rio de Janeiro) 28: 4 (1966). 
Octomeria juergensii Schltr., Repert. Spec. Nov. Regni Veg. Beih. 35: 64 (1925). 
Octomeria juncifolia Barb.Rodr., Gen. Spec. Orchid. 2: 110 (1881). 
Octomeria kestrochila Garay & Dunst., Venez. Orchids Ill. 6: 288 (1976). 
Octomeria lamellaris Luer, Selbyana 23: 30 (2002). 
Octomeria lancipetala C.Schweinf., Bot. Mus. Leafl. 19: 210 (1961). 
Octomeria leptophylla Barb.Rodr., Gen. Spec. Orchid. 2: 112 (1881). 
Octomeria lichenicola Barb.Rodr., Gen. Spec. Orchid. 2: 112 (1881). 
Octomeria linearifolia Barb.Rodr., Gen. Spec. Orchid. 2: 106 (1881). 
Octomeria lithophila (Barb.Rodr.) Barb.Rodr., Gen. Spec. Orchid. 2: 295 (1881). 
Octomeria lobulosa Rchb.f., Hamburger Garten- Blumenzeitung 14: 215 (1858). 
Octomeria loddigesii Lindl., Companion Bot. Mag. 2: 354 (1836). 
Octomeria longifolia Schltr., Repert. Spec. Nov. Regni Veg. Beih. 27: 58 (1924). 
Octomeria longipedicellata Seehawer, Orchidee (Hamburg) 56: 463 (2005). 
Octomeria margaretae Pabst ex Toscano, Bradea 3: 117 (1980). 
Octomeria mauritii Pabst & Moutinho, Bradea 3: 16 (1979). 
Octomeria medinae Luer & J.Portilla, Selbyana 23: 33 (2002). 
Octomeria micrantha Barb.Rodr., Gen. Spec. Orchid. 1: 33 (1877). 
Octomeria minor C.Schweinf., Bot. Mus. Leafl. 3: 89 (1935). 
Octomeria minuta Cogn. in C.F.P.von Martius & auct. suc. (eds.), Fl. Bras. 3(4): 633 (1896). 
Octomeria mocoana Schltr., Repert. Spec. Nov. Regni Veg. Beih. 27: 59 (1924). 
Octomeria montana Barb.Rodr., Gen. Spec. Orchid. 2: 108 (1881). 
Octomeria monticola C.Schweinf., Bot. Mus. Leafl. 9: 43 (1941). 
Octomeria nana C.Schweinf., Bot. Mus. Leafl. 19: 211 (1961). 
Octomeria ochroleuca Barb.Rodr., Gen. Spec. Orchid. 1: 31 (1877). 
Octomeria octomeriantha (Hoehne) Pabst, Bradea 1: 180 (1972). 
Octomeria oncidioides Luer, Revista Soc. Boliv. Bot. 4: 11 (2003). 
Octomeria oxychela Barb.Rodr., Gen. Spec. Orchid. 2: 99 (1881). 
Octomeria palmyrabellae Barb.Rodr., Rodriguésia 8: 38 (1937). 
Octomeria parvifolia Rolfe, Trans. Linn. Soc. London, Bot. 6: 60 (1901). 
Octomeria parvula C.Schweinf., Bot. Mus. Leafl. 3: 90 (1935). 
Octomeria peruviana D.E.Benn. & Christenson, Icon. Orchid. Peruv.: t. 521 (1998). 
Octomeria petulans Rchb.f., Hamburger Garten- Blumenzeitung 15: 59 (1859). 
Octomeria pinicola Barb.Rodr., Gen. Spec. Orchid. 2: 101 (1881). 
Octomeria portillae Luer & Hirtz, Monogr. Syst. Bot. Missouri Bot. Gard. 95: 235 (2004). 
Octomeria praestans Barb.Rodr., Gen. Spec. Orchid. 2: 112 (1881). 
Octomeria prostrata H.Stenzel, Lindleyana 16: 26 (2001). 
Octomeria pusilla Lindl., Companion Bot. Mag. 2: 354 (1836). 
Octomeria pygmaea C.Schweinf., Bot. Mus. Leafl. 14: 53 (1949). 
Octomeria recchiana Hoehne, Bol. Inst. Brasil. Sci. 3: 48 (1928). 
Octomeria reitzii Pabst, Sellowia 7: 178 (1956). 
Octomeria rhizomatosa C.Schweinf., Fieldiana: Botany 28(1): 188 (1951). 
Octomeria rhodoglossa Schltr., Notizbl. Bot. Gart. Berlin-Dahlem 7: 276 (1918). 
Octomeria rigida Barb.Rodr., Gen. Spec. Orchid. 2: 104 (1881). 
Octomeria riograndensis Schltr., Repert. Spec. Nov. Regni Veg. Beih. 35: 65 (1925). 
Octomeria rodeiensis Barb.Rodr., Gen. Spec. Orchid. 2: 105 (1881). 
Octomeria rodriguesii Cogn. in C.F.P.von Martius & auct. suc. (eds.), Fl. Bras. 3(4): 629 (1896). 
Octomeria rohrii Pabst, Orquídea (Rio de Janeiro) 13: 220 (1951). 
Octomeria romerorum Carnevali & I.Ramírez, Ann. Missouri Bot. Gard. 77: 551 (1990). 
Octomeria rotundata Luer & Hirtz, Selbyana 22: 117 (2001). 
Octomeria rotundiglossa Hoehne, Bot. Jahrb. Syst. 68: 137 (1937). 
Octomeria rubrifolia Barb.Rodr., Gen. Spec. Orchid. 1: 31 (1877). 
Octomeria sagittata (Rchb.f.) Garay, Bot. Mus. Leafl. 21: 253 (1967). 
Octomeria sancti-angeli Kraenzl., Kongl. Svenska Vetensk Akad. Handl. 46(10): 52 (1911). 
Octomeria sarcophylla Barb.Rodr., Gen. Spec. Orchid. 2: 104 (1881). 
Octomeria sarthouae Luer, Bull. Mus. Natl. Hist. Nat., B, Adansonia 13: 47 (1991). 
Octomeria saundersiana Rchb.f., Gard. Chron., n.s., 13: 264 (1880). 
Octomeria schultesii Pabst, Arq. Bot. Estado São Paulo, n.s., f.m., 3: 268 (1962). 
Octomeria scirpoidea (Poepp. & Endl.) Rchb.f., Bot. Zeitung (Berlin) 10: 856 (1852). 
Octomeria serrana Hoehne, Bol. Inst. Brasil. Sci. 3: 45 (1928). 
Octomeria setigera Pabst, Anais Congr. Soc. Bot. Brasil 14: 17 (1964). 
Octomeria spannagelii Hoehne, Arq. Bot. Estado São Paulo, n.s., f.m., 1(1): 17 (1938). 
Octomeria spatulata Rchb.f., Hamburger Garten- Blumenzeitung 16: 424 (1860). 
Octomeria splendida Garay & Dunst., Venez. Orchids Ill. 6: 292 (1976). 
Octomeria stellaris Barb.Rodr., Gen. Spec. Orchid. 2: 99 (1881). 
Octomeria steyermarkii Garay & Dunst., Venez. Orchids Ill. 3: 204 (1965). 
Octomeria tapiricataractae G.A.Romero & Luer, Harvard Pap. Bot. 7: 84 (2002). 
Octomeria taracuana Schltr., Beih. Bot. Centralbl. 42(2): 93 (1925). 
Octomeria tenuis Schltr., Repert. Spec. Nov. Regni Veg. 10: 455 (1912). 
Octomeria tricolor Rchb.f., Gard. Chron. 1872: 1035 (1872). 
Octomeria tridentata Lindl., Edwards's Bot. Reg. 25(Misc.): 35 (1839). 
Octomeria truncicola Barb.Rodr., Gen. Spec. Orchid. 2: 101 (1881). 
Octomeria umbonulata Schltr., Repert. Spec. Nov. Regni Veg. Beih. 35: 67 (1925). 
Octomeria unguiculata Schltr., Repert. Spec. Nov. Regni Veg. Beih. 35: 66 (1925). 
Octomeria ventii H.Dietr., in Fl. Rep. Cuba, Ser. A., 12(2): 17 (2007). 
Octomeria warmingii Rchb.f., Otia Bot. Hamburg.: 94 (1881). 
Octomeria wawrae Rchb.f. ex Wawra, Itin. Princ. S. Coburgi 2: 156 (1888). 
Octomeria wilsoniana Hoehne, Arch. Inst. Biol. Defesa Agric. 2: 51 (1929). 
Octomeria ximenae Luer & Hirtz, Selbyana 23: 33 (2002). 
Octomeria yauaperyensis Barb.Rodr., Vellosia, ed. 2, 1: 120 (1891).

References

  (1837) Hortus Kewensis; or, a Catalogue of the Plants Cultivated in the Royal Botanic Garden at Kew. London (2nd ed.) 5: 211.
  (2006) Epidendroideae (Part One). Genera Orchidacearum 4: 375ff. Oxford University Press.

External links

 
Orchids of South America
Pleurothallidinae genera